Within the context of international trade, a social clause is the integration of sustainability standards, such as the core ILO labour rights conventions into trade agreements. 

During the World Trade Organization Ministerial Conference of 1996, it became clear that no multilateral social clause would be adopted. There are social clauses in bi- and plurilateral agreements.

See also

 Decent work agenda of the ILO
 International Labour Organization Conventions
 Labour movement

References

International Labour Organization
International trade law
Labor rights
Social policy